The School of Ukrainian Language and Culture (SULC) founded in 2002 by Ukrainian Catholic University (Lviv, Ukraine) to promote the study of the Ukrainian language abroad and encourage international cultural exchange and relations.

The School of Ukrainian Language and Culture was established in 2002 as a summer program of Ukrainian studies for students from Canada. Since the institution of the program, the number of participants has grown from 20 to 200 students each year. Currently, the School offers twelve Ukrainian language courses and programs and is the largest Ukrainian school for foreigners in Ukraine. Over the course of 13 years, the School has taught almost 750 students from 21 countries around the world. A majority of students come from the United States, Canada, England, and Germany, while others have been from Australia, South America, Europe, Asia, and Africa.

External links 
 Official website

Educational institutions established in 2002
Academic language institutions
Ukrainian language
2002 establishments in Ukraine
Ukrainian Catholic University